Paris Honeymoon is a 1939 American musical film directed by Frank Tuttle and written by Frank Butler and Don Hartman. The film stars Bing Crosby, Franciska Gaal, Akim Tamiroff, Shirley Ross, Edward Everett Horton and Ben Blue. Filming took place in Hollywood from May 23 to July 1938 and the film was released on January 27, 1939, by Paramount Pictures.

Plot
Bing Crosby plays the role of Lucky Lawton, a cowboy millionaire, who is about to marry Barbara (Shirley Ross). Unfortunately there has been a delay in finalizing Barbara's divorce from her previous husband and while this is being sorted out in Paris, Lawton is persuaded to visit a Balkan town - Pushtalnick - where he stays in a castle and has various misadventures. The elected Rose Queen - Manya (Franciska Gaal) - takes a liking to Lawton and romantic interludes take place. Lawton returns to Paris for his wedding but is still thinking about Manya and he returns to Pushtalnick in time prevent Manya marrying Peter (Akim Tamiroff). Lawton and Manya then drive off together.

Cast
	
Bing Crosby as 'Lucky' Lawton
Franciska Gaal as Manya
Akim Tamiroff as Mayor Peter Karloca
Shirley Ross as Barbara Wayne 
Edward Everett Horton as Ernest Figg
Ben Blue as Sitska
Rafaela Ottiano as Fluschotska
Gregory Gaye as Count Georges De Remi

Luana Walters as Angela
Alex Melesh as Pulka Tomasto
Victor Kilian as Old Villager
Michael Visaroff as Judge
Keith Hitchcock as Butler 
Raymond Hatton as Huskins
Evelyn Keyes as a village girl

Reception
Bosley Crowther writing in The New York Times commented: "The Old World charm of Bing Crosby in a ten-gallon hat is the principal Parisian motif in “Paris Honeymoon” (at the Paramount) which marks a return to the ancient Crosby formula of the days before “Sing You Sinners.” There is something almost engaging, however, about the conventional Paramount-Crosby plot, with its irreducible intellectual content and the way everybody concerned just quietly ignores it, as well-bred people always ignore unpleasant necessities... Bing, for instance, never bothers to pretend that he is really a millionaire cowboy, really in love with Shirley Ross, the heiress divorcée... One thing about Bing, you never catch him acting. He is always himself."
 
Variety said: "Bing Crosby, back with a bundle of tuneful melodies, nonchalantly meanders through a light romance of the Prince Charming-peasant Cinderella type, displaying a more convincing personality than heretofore. With a group of known featured names surrounding Crosby, aiding considerably in dishing out the entertainment factors, picture is heading for substantial boxoffice...There’s a greater ease and assurance displayed by Crosby in his handling of the lead spot than previously. He times his lines better, and gives a corking performance throughout. . . Crosby’s four songs are exceptional..."

Soundtrack
"I Have Eyes" (Ralph Rainger / Leo Robin) sung by Bing Crosby and Shirley Ross.  
"You're a Sweet Little Headache" (Ralph Rainger / Leo Robin) sung by Bing Crosby.
"The Funny Old Hills" (Ralph Rainger / Leo Robin) sung by Bing Crosby.
"Joobalai" (Ralph Rainger / Leo Robin) sung by Bing Crosby.
"I Ain't Got Nobody" sung by Bing Crosby.
"Bulgarian Rose Song" (Ralph Rainger / Leo Robin) sung by chorus.

Bing Crosby recorded five of the songs for Decca Records. "I Have Eyes", "You're a Sweet Little Headache" and "The Funny Old Hills" all achieved top ten positions in the charts. Crosby's songs were also included in the Bing's Hollywood series.

References

External links
 

1939 films
American black-and-white films
1930s English-language films
Films directed by Frank Tuttle
Paramount Pictures films
Films set in Paris
1939 musical comedy films
American musical comedy films
1930s American films